Shihan is a Jordanian weekly newspaper published in Arabic. The word  Shihan is also the name for a mountain located in the southern part of Jordan, close to the city of Al-Karak.

History and profile
Shihan is being published weekly by Arab Printers Company. The paper has ties with the Muslim Brotherhood group in Jordan.

On 2 February 2006 Shihan published the caricatures of Muhammad originally published by the Jyllands-Posten. The reaction of the Jordanian street to this controversial move resulted in the firing the newspaper's editor, Jihad Al Momeny.

See also
 List of newspapers in Jordan

References

1991 establishments in Jordan
Newspapers published in Jordan
Arabic-language newspapers
Publications established in 1991
Weekly newspapers
Mass media in Amman